Chilo crypsimetalla is a moth in the family Crambidae. It was described by Alfred Jefferis Turner in 1911. It is found in Australia, where it has been recorded from Queensland and the Northern Territory. It is also present on Prince of Wales Island.

References

Chiloini
Moths described in 1911